Events from the year 1974 in Scotland.

Incumbents 

 Secretary of State for Scotland and Keeper of the Great Seal – Gordon Campbell until 4 March; then Willie Ross

Law officers 
 Lord Advocate – Norman Wylie; then Ronald King Murray
 Solicitor General for Scotland – William Stewart until March; then John McCluskey

Judiciary 
 Lord President of the Court of Session and Lord Justice General – Lord Emslie
 Lord Justice Clerk – Lord Wheatley
 Chairman of the Scottish Land Court – Lord Birsay

Events 
 27 January –  capsizes in the Firth of Clyde.
 28 February – The February general election results in the first hung parliament in the UK since 1929, though Labour does win a majority of seats in Scotland. The Scottish National Party make a breakthrough winning 7 MPs.
 March
 Brora Coalfield is abandoned.
 Last permanent inhabitants of Swona leave.
 6 May – Inauguration of full electric service on British Rail's West Coast Main Line through to Glasgow Central railway station.
 10 October – The second general election of the year results in a narrow victory for Prime Minister Harold Wilson, giving Labour a slim majority of three seats. Labour also wins a majority of seats in Scotland for a second time in the year; whilst the Scottish National Party secures its highest-ever Westminster representation up to this date with 11 seats. It would be 41 years before the SNP would not only beat their own record result; but also replace Labour as the largest political party in Scotland.
 31 December – Idi Amin, President of Uganda, issues a proclamation in support of Scottish independence.
 Calum MacLeod (of Raasay) completes a 10-year self-imposed task of personally constructing "Calum's Road", a nearly 2 mile (3 km) track at the north end of the island.
 Last permanent inhabitants of Taransay leave.

Births 
 15 January – Edith Bowman, DJ
 17 January – Danny Bhoy, born Danni Chaudhry, comedian
 9 August – Lesley McKenna, snowboarder
 23 August – Ray Park, actor
 20 October – Limmy, born Brian Limond, comedian and social media personality
 30 October – Kerry McGregor, singer-songwriter and actress
 9 December – Fiona MacDonald, curler
 31 December – Kathryn Joseph, born Kathryn Sawers, singer-songwriter

Deaths 
 24 January – Andrew Dewar Gibb, lawyer and Scottish National Party politician (born 1888)
 29 May – James MacTaggart, television producer (born 1928)

The arts
 6 June – a television version of The Cheviot, the Stag, and the Black Black Oil is broadcast by the BBC as part of the Play for Today series.

See also 
 1974 in Northern Ireland

References 

 
Scotland
Years of the 20th century in Scotland
1970s in Scotland